Primorsko-Akhtarsk is a port town and the administrative center of Primorsko-Akhtarsky District of Krasnodar Krai, Russia, located on the coast of the Sea of Azov,  northwest of Krasnodar, the administrative center of the krai. Population:

History
It was founded in 1829. Town status was granted to it in 1949.

A Russian Air Force base is located to the north east.

Administrative and municipal status
Within the framework of administrative divisions, Primorsko-Akhtarsk serves as the administrative center of Primorsko-Akhtarsky District. As an administrative division, it is, together with three rural localities, incorporated within Primorsko-Akhtarsky District as the Town of Primorsko-Akhtarsk. As a municipal division, the Town of Primorsko-Akhtarsk is incorporated within Primorsko-Akhtarsky Municipal District as Primorsko-Akhtarskoye Urban Settlement.

Climate

References

Notes

Sources

Cities and towns in Krasnodar Krai